Seghin (also Romanized as Şeghīn, Saghīn, Seghīn, Soghīn, and Sagheyn; also known as Sagin, Sakhang, Saqīnak, Saqīnk, Seh Ghenk, and Shaghīn) is a village in Hanza Rural District, Hanza District, Rabor County, Kerman Province, Iran. At the 2006 census, its population was 32, in 12 families.

References 

Populated places in Rabor County